Anthony Charles Thear (born 4 February 1948) is an English former professional footballer of the late 1960s.  He played professionally for Arsenal, Luton Town and Gillingham and made a total of 20 appearances in the Football League.

References

1948 births
Living people
English footballers
Association football forwards
English Football League players
Arsenal F.C. players
Gillingham F.C. players
Luton Town F.C. players
Footballers from Edmonton, London